15th CFCA Awards
January 8, 2003

Best Film: 
 Far from Heaven 
The 15th Chicago Film Critics Association Awards, given on 8 January 2003, honored the finest achievements in 2002 filmmaking.

Winners

Best Actor: 
Daniel Day-Lewis – Gangs of New York
Best Actress: 
Julianne Moore – Far from Heaven
Best Cinematography: 
Far from Heaven
Best Director: 
Todd Haynes – Far from Heaven
Best Documentary Feature: 
Bowling for Columbine
Best Film: 
Far from Heaven
Best Foreign Language Film: 
Y Tu Mamá También (And Your Mother Too), Mexico/USA
Best Score: 
Far from Heaven
Best Screenplay: 
Adaptation. – Charlie and Donald Kaufman
Best Supporting Actor: 
Dennis Quaid – Far from Heaven
Best Supporting Actress: 
Meryl Streep – Adaptation.
Most Promising Filmmaker: 
Dylan Kidd – Roger Dodger
Most Promising Performer: 
Maggie Gyllenhaal – Secretary, Adaptation. and Confessions of a Dangerous Mind

References
http://www.ew.com/ew/article/0,,406841,00.html Chicago awards winners

 2002
2002 film awards